Danford is both a surname and a given name. Notable people with the name include:

Surname
Dave Danford (born 1984), British percussionist
Harry Danford (born c. 1939), Politician in Ontario
Lorenzo Danford (1829–1899), U.S. Representative from Ohio
Ryan Danford (born 1985), Professional American Halo player

Given name
Arnold Danford Patrick Heeney (1902–1970), Canadian lawyer, diplomat and civil servant
Danford Balch (1811–1859), Oregon pioneer
Danford N. Barney (1808–1874), American expressman 
Danford B. Greene (1928–2015), American film and television editor 
Samuel Danford Nicholson (1859–1923), United States Senator

See also
Danford iris (Iris danfordiae), bulbous perennial, in the species in the genus Iris
Samuel Danford Farm, historic complex of buildings in northeastern Noble County, Ohio, United States